Andrés Blanco is a Venezuelan baseball player

Andrés Blanco can also refer to:
 
Andrés Eloy Blanco, a Venezuelan poet and politician
Andrés Eloy Blanco Municipality, Lara, a municipality of Lara State in Venezuela
Andrés Blanco (Argentina), Argentine Trotskyist activist